Jeddore may refer to:

 Jeddore (surname)
 Jeddore Oyster Pond, Nova Scotia
 East Jeddore, Nova Scotia
 Head of Jeddore, Nova Scotia
 West Jeddore, Nova Scotia
 Jeddore, Nova Scotia